LP Winner Motorsport is a Hungarian auto racing team based in Budapest, Hungary. The team was founded as and still races under the Botka Rally Team banner. The team competes in both track racing and rallying. The team has raced in the TCR International Series, since 2017. The team also takes part in multiple rallies and races in the ADAC TCR Germany Touring Car Championship.

ADAC TCR Germany Touring Car Championship
The team was announced as a part of the 44 car grid for the 2017 ADAC TCR Germany Touring Car Championship, where they will enter two Kia Cee'd TCRs for Balázs Fekete and István Bernula.

TCR International Series

Kia Cee'd TCR (2017–)
After having rallied for many seasons, the team entered the 2017 TCR International Series with István Bernula driving a Kia Cee'd TCR. Bernula qualified 20th and did not start Race 1 due to a technical problem, before finishing 16th in Race 2.

References

External links
 

Hungarian auto racing teams
TCR International Series teams
Auto racing teams established in 2011